Deborah L. Best is the William L. Poteat Professor of Psychology at Wake Forest University in Winston-Salem, North Carolina.

Education 
Best earned a bachelor's degree in psychology and an MA in General Experimental Psychology at Wake Forest University, and a PhD in developmental psychology at the University of North Carolina at Chapel Hill.

Career 
Best is a professor of psychology at Wake Forest University and served as the first female Dean of the College at Wake Forest University.

Best is the Editor-in-Chief of The Journal of Cross-Cultural Psychology. Best is also a former president of the International Association for Cross-Cultural Psychology. Best is the recipient of the 2017 American Psychology Association's  - Division 52 - Florence L. Denmark and Mary E. Reuder Award.

Books 
Measuring sex stereotypes: A thirty nation study. J. E. Williams and D.L. Best, (1982, Berkeley, CA: Sage Publications).

Sex and psyche: Gender and self viewed cross-culturally. J. E. Williams and D.L. Best, (1990, Newbury Park, CA: Sage Publications)

References

Wake Forest University faculty
American women psychologists
21st-century American psychologists
Year of birth missing (living people)
Living people
Wake Forest University alumni
University of North Carolina at Chapel Hill alumni
American women academics
21st-century American women